Reforestation efforts are being made in Costa Rica to recondition its biodiversity and ecosystems that were affected by heavy deforestation in the 1900s.

History 
Costa Rica has six different ecosystems, and is considered a biodiversity hotspot– having 5% of the world's total biodiversity within 0.1% of its landmass. The decline of the Costa Rican rainforest was due to unplanned logging in the mid-1900s. Loggers cleared much of the tropical rainforest for profit. By the 1990s, Costa Rica had the world's highest global deforestation rates. As a result, the Costa Rican government began its efforts to repair the damage inflicted on their landscape during this time and to develop in a sustainable manner.

Deforestation 
In the 1940s, agriculture and unchecked logging were the main catalyst of the rapid decline of Costa Rica's indigenous woodlands. By the 1980s, two-thirds of the tropical rainforest were lost to these deforestation practices. Such rapid and forceful deforestation was due to the country's inappropriate policies like: cheap credit for cattle, land-titling laws which rewarded deforestation and rapid or imprudent expansion of road systems.

Purpose 
A vast amount of the Costa Rican natural landscape was lost, therefore the government introduced two measures to protect and revive it. Firstly, the government made it illegal to clear forest without permission. Secondly, the government introduced payments for ecological services (PES) which provided an economic incentive to conserve and restore the forest.

These measures were so successful that, in 2021, the country won the first-ever Earthshot prize for their conservation efforts.

In an attempt to reverse the harmful effects caused by the inappropriate policies which drove reforestion, Costa Rica started using the PES program (Payment for Environental Services). The PES program gave financial incentives to owners of lands and forest planations for forest protection, reforestation and sustainable landscaping.

The PES program led to several social benefits, improving quality of life and economic stanses. Between 1997 and 2019, more than 18,000 families benefited from the financial contributions.

Projects 
Several initiatives and projects have been created to protect and restore nature including the Guanacaste Conservation Area (ACG) and BaumInvest.

Guanacaste Conservation Area (ACG) 
The Guanacaste Conservation Area (ACG) consists of 163,000 acres of lands under the administration of the Sistema Nacional de Areas de Conservacion (SINAC). The ACG was created in 1986 with the mission to restore tropical dry forests, and surrounding ecosystems that have endured destruction caused by human action. Their efforts began in the area of Santa Rosa National Park, created in 1971. ACG focuses on the restoration, survival and conservation of the rich flora and fauna that occupy these lands and have been threatened by hundreds of years of human occupation.

BaumInvest 
The BaumInvest reforestation project in Costa Rica began in 2007. This projects seeks to establish sustainable forestry and carbon compensation through afforestation. About 1,280 acres of pastureland has been reforested with native woods (more than one million trees were planted). This project led to the recuperation of 70 different amphibian and reptile species, as well as the survival of the Dipteryx panamensis (an endangered tree species). The project also provided several positive social impacts such as: promoting environmental education, and creating secure and sustainable rural jobs which helps reduce illegal logging, poaching and animal trading.

This project was the first reforestation project awarded the Gold Standard Certification for its positive impact on the environment.

See also 

 Deforestation in Costa Rica
 Wildlife of Costa Rica

References 

Wikipedia Student Program
Forestry in Costa Rica
Reforestation